Krásnohorské Podhradie is a village and municipality in the Rožňava District in the Košice Region of middle-eastern Slovakia.

The town has a relative Hungarian majority and a Slovak and Roma minority . The town is dominated by its namesake, the iconic Castle of Krásna Hôrka.

History
In historical records the village was first mentioned in 1322.

Geography
The village lies at an altitude of 369 metres and covers an area of 23.171 km².
It has a population of about 2,480 people.

Culture
The village has a public library, a football pitch, and an iconic Andrássy Castle of Krásna Hôrka. The castle was burned down in 2012.

Gallery

References

External links 
 Krásnohorské Podhradie
 www.krasnohorskepodhradie.sk

Villages and municipalities in Rožňava District
Andrássy family
Hungarian communities in Slovakia